Rolf Thieme (9 March 1944 – 5 January 2010) was a German field hockey player. He competed in the men's tournament at the 1968 Summer Olympics.

References

External links
 

1944 births
2010 deaths
German male field hockey players
Olympic field hockey players of East Germany
Field hockey players at the 1968 Summer Olympics
Sportspeople from Leipzig